The Church of the Intercession of the Mother of God in Harbin (in  or in Russian: Церковь Покрова в Харбине) is an Eastern Orthodox church in Harbin, China.

This church is located in the "church street", north east of "Hongbo Square" (where St. Nicolas' Central Church used to be), on East Dazhi Avenue, where there are also Harbin Nangang Christian Church (Protestant) and Sacred Heart Cathedral of Harbin (Catholic).

The Church of the Intercession, formerly also called the Ukrainian Church in Harbin, is currently the only Orthodox Church in Harbin, and indeed in all of mainland China, open to Chinese nationals for regular worship.

Its summarized history is as follows:

 In 1902, a prayer house was built in the Russian cemetery.
 In 1922, as the China Eastern Railway was being built, the Russians built a wooden church building at the site of current church.
 In 1930, the China Eastern Railway donated the present stone church building. The architect was Tidanov.
 Until 1947, the congregation was composed predominantly of Ukrainians who had fled east from the Russian Revolution in 1917.
 In 1958, during Great Leap Forward and Cultural Revolution, as the Chinese-Soviet relationship soured, the Russians and Ukrainians left China, forcing discontinuance of the church activities.
 On  1984, coinciding with the church's patron saint's feast day, the restoration of the temple was finally completed, and it reopened for worship services, conducted by Father Gregory Zhu Shipu, who served at the church from its re-opening until his passing in 2000, leaving the temple without a permanent rector for fifteen years, until the installation of recently-ordained Father Alexander Yu Shi, whose first liturgy was the Orthodox Easter Service on April 18, 2016

Services 
The church is open from 9 to 11am on Sundays and Typica is usually prayed in Chinese at 10am.

References

External links 

 Geographic coordinates: 
 Harbin Church of Chinese Orthodox Church (Harbin Urban & Rural Planning Bureau, Harbin City Government)

See also 

 Christianity in China
 Chinese Orthodox Church
 Russian Orthodox Church
 Ukrainian Orthodox Church
 Harbin Russians
 Saint Sophia Cathedral in Harbin

Eastern Orthodox church buildings in China
Churches in Harbin
Chinese Orthodox Church
Ukrainian diaspora in Asia
20th-century churches in China